Mike Spano (born April 22, 1964) is an American politician who serves as the 42nd mayor of Yonkers, New York. He is a member of the Democratic Party. A former Republican, he served as a member of the New York State Assembly.

Biography
Born and raised in Yonkers, New York, Spano is the ninth of sixteen children born to Josephine and Leonard Spano (1930–2019). Spano was first elected to the New York State Assembly in 1992 as the assembly's youngest member. Due to the state's reapportionment plan, his seat was eliminated later that same year. However, he ran again in 1994 and continued to serve in the New York State Assembly for nearly a decade until he chose not to run for re-election.

Within the private sector, Spano worked for a New York governmental relations firm and served on the Board of Directors for Leake and Watts Services. After his children became school-aged, he decided to return to public service and ran successfully once again for the State Assembly where he represented the people of Yonkers in the 93rd Assembly District.

On November 8, 2011, Spano was elected as mayor of the City of Yonkers, New York. During his tenure, Spano has passed two consecutive bipartisan budgets that included historic investment in education and kept taxes within the New York State property tax cap.

He was reelected to a second term as mayor in 2015.

In 2019, Spano was reelected to a third term as mayor following a revision in the city charter which overturned term limits by the Yonkers City Council. Spano had previously said he would not seek a third term, stating, “even if they did overturn term limits, as much as I love being mayor, I wouldn’t seek a third term.”

Spano is also a member of numerous community organizations such as the Yonkers Chamber of Commerce, Access Westchester, Exchange Club of Yonkers, Sons of Italy, and an Honorary Member (non-veteran) of the Armando Rauso AMVETS Post. He is also a former member of the board of directors of Westchester School for Special Children and donor to the Luis Pani foundation.

Spano appeared on the TV show Impractical Jokers during Murr's punishment that took place at Yonkers City Hall in the episode "Speech Impediment".

A lifelong Yonkers resident, Spano is married to CBS newscaster Mary Calvi and has three children.

References

External links
 
 http://www.yonkersny.gov/
https://www.facebook.com/MayorMikeSpano/

Living people
Members of the New York State Assembly
Mayors of Yonkers, New York
New York (state) Republicans
New York (state) Democrats
Politicians from Westchester County, New York
1964 births
21st-century American politicians